Altan Erol (born May 28, 1983) is a Turkish professional basketball player for Merkezefendi Belediyesi Denizli Basket of the Turkish Basketball First League.

Professional career
Born in Bursa, Erol played for his local club Oyak Renault from 2002 to 2007. The club played in the Turkish Basketball League from 2002 to 2004 before they were demoted and played in the Turkish Basketball Second League for two seasons, before returning to the first division for the 2006–07 season.

In 2007, Erol joined Mersin BB where he played for three seasons. In June 2010, he signed with Erdemirspor where he was named an All-Star in 2011–12. He then returned to Mersin BB in 2012 where he played a further two seasons.

In June 2014, Erol signed a one-year deal with Royal Halı Gaziantep.

On July 11, 2019, he has signed with Bahçeşehir Koleji of the Turkish Basketbol Süper Ligi. 

On January 15, 2020, he has signed with Merkezefendi Belediyesi Denizli Basket of the Turkish Basketball First League.

References

External links
Eurobasket.com Profile
RealGM.com Profile
TBLStat.net Profile

1983 births
Living people
Afyonkarahisar Belediyespor players
Bahçeşehir Koleji S.K. players
Erdemirspor players
Gaziantep Basketbol players
Merkezefendi Belediyesi Denizli Basket players
Mersin Büyükşehir Belediyesi S.K. players
Oyak Renault basketball players
Shooting guards
Turkish men's basketball players
21st-century Turkish people